Overbury is an English language surname shared by these notable persons:

Mary Anstie Overbury (c. 1851–1926), artist, designer and teacher of art in South Australia
Sir Nicholas Overbury (1551–1643), English lawyer, landowner and politician who sat in the House of Commons 1604–1611
Sir Thomas Overbury (c. 1580–1613), son of Sir Nicholas, English lawyer, poet and essayist, victim of murder which led to a scandalous trial
Walter Overbury (1592–1637), son of Sir Nicholas, English politician who sat in the House of Commons at various times between 1621 and 1626